The Craig Thomas Discovery and Visitor Center is located in Grand Teton National Park in the U.S. state of Wyoming. The visitor center is open from early spring until the fall. 

Opened in 2007 to replace an old and inadequate facility, the Craig Thomas Discovery and Visitor Center was built with a combination of federal grants and private donations and is adjacent to the park headquarters in Moose, Wyoming. Fund raising efforts for an adjoining 154-seat auditorium were nearing completion as of 2011. Exhibits include the park's natural history, mountaineering and Western artifacts.

References

External links
 Craig Thomas Discovery & Visitor Center - Grand Teton National Park

Buildings and structures in Grand Teton National Park
Tourist attractions in Teton County, Wyoming
Museums in Teton County, Wyoming
2007 establishments in Wyoming